Sturkö is a locality located on the island Sturkö in Karlskrona Municipality, Blekinge County, Sweden with 1,264 inhabitants in 2010.

Sports
The following sports clubs are located in Sturkö:

 AIK Atlas

References 

Populated places in Karlskrona Municipality
Islands of Blekinge County